Atom Ellis (born April 8, 1966) is a bass guitarist from San Francisco, California.  Atom was a founding member of the Thrash Funk band Psychefunkapus from 1986 to 1992 and a member of the San Francisco band Dieselhed from 1993 to 2000.  During and after his tenure with Dieselhed he also performed as a regular sideman for Link Wray from 1996 to 2003.

For shorter stints Atom performed and recorded with World Entertainment War, The Pop-o-pies, Linda Perry, Virgil Shaw, Richard Thompson, Carl Hancock Rux, Neil Hamburger, Chuck Prophet, and Brittany Shane.

Atom Ellis has more recently toured as bassist and backup vocalist for The New Cars.

Ellis toured with The Tubes during summer 2010.

Selected discography
 Psychefunkapus-"Psychefunkapus" (1990- Atlantic #82063, credits: Bass/Vocals)
 Psychefunkapus-"Skin" (1991- Atlantic #82331, credits: Bass/Vocals)
 World Entertainment War (1991-Popular Metaphysics/MCA #10137, credits: Backing Vocals)
 Pop-o-Pies- "In Frisco" (1993- Amarillo #581, credits: Bass Guitar)
 Dieselhed- "Dieselhed" (1995- Amarillo #590, credits: Bass/Backing Vocals)
 Dieselhed- "Tales of a Brown Dragon" (1996- Amarillo #601, credits: Bass/Backing Vocals)
 Dieselhed- "Shallow Water Blackout" (1997- Amarillo #608, credits: Bass/Backing Vocals)
 Dieselhed- "Elephant Rest Home" (1999- Bongload BOOOOODFHN, credits: Bass/Backing Vocals)
 Richard Thompson- "Mock Tudor" (1999- Capitol #98860, credits: Electric Bass Guitar)
 Carl Hancock Rux- "Rux Review" (1999- Sony #69644, credits: Bass Guitar)
 Dieselhed- "Chico and the Flute" (2001- Bongload, credits: Bass/Backing Vocals)
 Richard Thompson- "Action Packed, The Capitol Years" (2001- Capitol #31051, credits: Electric Bass Guitar)
 Virgil Shaw- "Still Falling" (2003- Future Farmer BOOOO83MGL, credits: Bass Guitar)
 Chuck Prophet- "Age of Miracles" (2004- New West Records BOOO2UJKQS, credits: Bass guitar)
 Brittany Shane- "Brittany Shane" (2007- Brittany Shane #275569, credits: Bass Guitar)
 Neil Hamburger - "Sings Country Winners" (2008- Drag City Records DC363, credits: Bass/Ukulele)

References

External links 
 Atom Ellis interview on RundgrenRadio.com

1966 births
American rock bass guitarists
Living people
American male bass guitarists
20th-century American bass guitarists
Dieselhed members
Saigon Kick members
20th-century American male musicians